The city of Ottawa, Canada held municipal elections on December 2, 1929, to elect members of the 1930 Ottawa City Council.

Mayor of Ottawa
Controller Frank H. Plant was elected mayor without opposition.

Ottawa Board of Control
All three incumbent controllers were re-elected. Businessman John J. Allen was the only newcomer elected.

(4 elected)

Ottawa City Council
All incumbent alderman who ran were re-elected. Two new wards were created for this election, Elmdale in the city's west end, and Riverdale in the city's south. The incumbent aldermen from Dalhousie both ran in Elmdale. One of the incumbent aldermen from Capital Ward (George Pushman) ran in Riverdale.

(2 elected from each ward)

References
Ottawa Citizen, December 3, 1929; pg 20

Municipal elections in Ottawa
1929 elections in Canada
1920s in Ottawa
1929 in Ontario